Bongeka Gamede (born 22 May 1999) is a South African soccer player who plays as a defender for the University of the Western Cape (UWC) and the South Africa women's national team.

Career
Gamede's home town is Ixopo in KwaZulu-Natal. A former South African under-17 and under-20 international, she was included in the South African squad for the 2019 FIFA Women's World Cup despite having never previously represented the national team at senior level. A tourism student at the University of the Western Cape, she had to postpone her first year exams to appear at the tournament. She made her international debut in a pre-World Cup friendly against Norway on 2 June 2019, coming on as a substitute in South Africa's 7–2 defeat.

References

1999 births
Living people
South African women's soccer players
South Africa women's international soccer players
Women's association football defenders
2019 FIFA Women's World Cup players
People from Ubuhlebezwe Local Municipality
Soccer players from KwaZulu-Natal